Narragansett  is an Algonquian language formerly spoken in most of what is today Rhode Island by the Narragansett people. It was closely related to the other Algonquian languages of southern New England like Massachusett and Mohegan-Pequot. The earliest study of the language in English was by Roger Williams, founder of the Rhode Island colony, in his book A Key Into the Language of America (1643).

Name
The word Narragansett means, literally, '(People) of the Small Point.' The "point" may be located on the Salt Pond in Washington County. (Great Salt Pond Archeological District).

History

Traditionally the tribe spoke the Narragansett language, a member of the Algonquian language family. The language became almost entirely extinct during the centuries of European colonization in New England through cultural assimilation.

The tribe has begun language revival efforts, based on early-20th-century books and manuscripts, and new teaching programs. The Narragansett spoke a "Y-dialect", similar enough to the "N-dialects" of the Massachusett and Wampanoag to be mutually intelligible.  Other Y-dialects include the Shinnecock and Pequot languages spoken historically by tribes on Long Island and in Connecticut, respectively.

In the 17th century, Roger Williams, a co-founder of Rhode Island, learned the tribe's language. He documented it in his 1643 work, A Key Into the Language of America.  Williams gave the tribe's name as Nanhigganeuck.

American English has absorbed a number of loan words from Narragansett and other closely related languages, such as Wampanoag and Massachusett.  Such words include quahog, moose, papoose, powwow, squash, and succotash.

Language revival efforts 
According to Dr. Frank Waabu O'Brien, who has taught the language for the Aquidneck Indian Council, "Narragansett was understood throughout New England." He states that "Scholars refer to Massachusett and Narragansett as dialects of the same language," and has created a diagram of the relationships between the languages as described in their source documentation as well as instructional materials. A Facebook page entitled "Speaking Our Narragansett Language" has provided alphabet and vocabulary of the language.

Orthography
A, Ch, E, H, I, K, M, N, P, Q, S, Sh, T, Ty, U, W, Y

 a – 
 ã – 
 ch – 
 e – 
 h – 
 i – 
 k – 
 m – 
 n – 
 p – 
 qu – 
 s – 
 sh – 
 t – 
 ty – 
 u – 
 w – 
 y –

Phonology

See also
Narragansett people
Eastern Algonquian languages
The Narragansett Dawn

Notes

References

 Aubin, George Francis. A Historical Phonology of Narragansett. Providence, Rhode Island: Brown University. (Unpublished Ph.D. Dissertation, 1972).
 Aubin, George Francis. Roger Williams: Another View. International Journal of American Linguistics vol. 38, pp. 266–277, 1972.
 Aubin, George Francis. "More on Narragansett Keesuckquand." International  Journal of American Linguistics 41 (1975): 239-40.
 Aubin, George Francis. (1975). A Proto-Algonquian Dictionary. Ottawa : National Museums of Canada.
 Aubin, George Francis. Narragansett Color Terms. pp. 105–114 in Papers of the 7th Algonquian Conference, 1975, William Cowan, ed., Ottawa: Carleton University.
 Aubin, George Francis. Quelques aspects du système consonantique du narragansett. pp. 151–155 in Actes du 8e Congrès des Algonquinistes, 1976, William Cowan, ed., Ottawa: Carleton University.
 Bragdon, Kathleen J. (1996). Native People of Southern New England, 1500-1650. Norman, OK: University of Oklahoma Press.
 Bragdon, Kathleen J. (2009) Native People of Southern New England 1650–1775. Norman, University of Oklahoma Press.
 Brinley, Francis. (1900). “Francis Brinley’s Briefe Narrative of the Nanhiganset Countrey. Publications of the Rhode Island Historical Society, 8(2):69‐96. Providence, RI. 
 Chartrand, Leon.  (May 3, 2017). “Darkness Walker.”, Darkness Walker — Bear Solitaire (leonchartrand.com)
 Cowan, William. "General Treat's Vocabulary of Narragansett." In Papers of the Thirteenth Algonquian Conference. Ottawa: Carleton University, 1982.
 Cowan, William. "PA *a, *k and *t in Narragansett." International Journal of American Linguistics 35 (1969): 28-33.
 Cowan, William. Narragansett 126 Years After. International Journal of American Linguistics 39 (1973) (1):7-13.
 Gatschet, Albert S. “Narragansett Vocabulary Collected in 1879”. International Journal of American Linguistics 39(1): 14, (1973).
  Goddard, Ives .“Eastern Algonquian languages.” In Bruce Trigger (ed.), Handbook of North American Indians, vol. 15 (Northeast), (1978),70-77.
  Goddard, Ives (Volume Editor, 1996). Handbook of North American Indians, Vol. 17(Languages). Washington, DC: Smithsonian Institution.
  Gray, Nicole. “Aurality in Print: Revisiting Roger Williams's A Key into the Language of America.” PMLA/Publications of the Modern Language Association of America 131 (2016): 64 - 83.
 Hagenau, Walter P. A Morphological Study of Narragansett Indian Verbs in Roger Williams’ A Key into the Language of America. Providence, RI: Brown University (Unpublished M.A. Thesis, 1962).
 Hamp, Eric P. "On Nasalization in Narragansett." International Journal of American Linguistics 36 (1970): 58-9.
 Kinnicutt, Lincoln Newton (1870). Principal part of Roger Williams key to the Indian language : arranged alphabetically from Vol. 1, of the Rhode Island Historical Society.
 LaFantasie, Glenn W., ed. (1988). The Correspondence of Roger Williams. 2 vols. Providence, Rhode Island: Brown University Press.
 Lewis, Nathan (1897). “The Last of the Narragansetts”. Proceedings of the Worcester Society of Antiquity. Vol. XLI.
 Mierle, Shelley. "Further Evidence Regarding the Intrusive Nasal in Narragansett." International Journal of American Linguistics 41 (1975): 78-80.
The Narragansett Dawn.  Miscellaneous articles on the Narragansett Language.
"Lesson Two in Narragansett Tongue." The Narragansett Dawn 1 (June 1935): 14-5.
"Lesson No. Three in Narragansett Tongue." The Narragansett Dawn 1 (July 1935): 10.
"The Narragansett Tongue- Lesson 4.” The Narragansett Dawn 1 (August 1935): 88-9.
"The Narragansett Tongue- Lesson 5." The Narragansett Dawn 1 (September 1935): 122-4.
"Narragansett Lesson No. 6." The Narragansett Dawn 1 (October 1935): 138-9.
"Narragansett Tongue- Lessons 7 and 8." The Narragansett Dawn 1 (December 1935): 185-7.
"Narragansett Tongue- Lesson 9." The Narragansett Dawn 1 (January 1936): 204.
"Narragansett Tongue- Lesson 10." The Narragansett Dawn 1 (February 1936): 232.
"Narragansett Tongue- Lesson 11." The Narragansett Dawn 1 (March 1936): 259-60.
"Narragansett Tongue- Lesson 12." The Narragansett Dawn 1 (April 1936): 287.
"Narragansett Tongue- Lesson 13." The Narragansett Dawn 2 (May 1936): 5.
"Narragansett Tongue- Lesson 14." The Narragansett Dawn 2 (June 1936): 29.
"Narragansett Words." The Narragansett Dawn 2 (October 1936): 6.
  Mashantucket Pequot Research Library, Pequot and Related Languages, A Bibliography
 Moondancer and Strong Woman (2000). Indian Grammar Dictionary for N Dialect: A Study of A Key into the Language of America by Roger Williams, 1643.  Newport, RI: Aquidneck Indian Council. .
 O'Brien, Frank Waabu (2004). Bibliography for Studies of  American Indians  in and Around Rhode Island : 16th – 21st Centuries. 
 Rider, Sidney S.  (1904). Map of the Colony of Rhode Island: Giving the Indian Names of Locations  and the Locations of Great Events in Indian History with Present Political Divisions Indicate. In The Lands of Rhode Island as They Were Known to Caunounicus and Miatunnomu When Roger Williams Came. Providence, Rhode Island: Sidney S. Rider.
 Simmons, William S. (1978). “Narragansett.” In Bruce Trigger (ed.), Handbook of North American Indians, Vol. 15 (Northeast). Washington, DC: Smithsonian Institution, pp. 190-197.
 Strong Heart and Firefly Song of the Wind Sekatau. ”The Nahahigganisk Indians". Bicentential 1976, pp. 1–17.
 Williams, Roger (1643). A Key into the Language of America:, or, an Help to the Language of the Natives in that Part of America called New-England. Together, with Briefe Observations of the Customes, Manners and Worships, etc. of the Aforesaid Natives, in Peace and Warre, in Life and Death. On all which are added Spirituall Observations, General and Particular by the Author of chiefe and Special use (upon all occasions) to all the English Inhabiting those parts; yet pleasant and profitable to the view of all men. London: Gregory Dexter. [Reprinted, Providence: Narragansett Club, 1866, J. H. Trumbull [Ed.] & Fifth Edition (reprinted Applewood Books, nd.)].
 Wojciechowski, Franz L.The Search for an Elusive 1765 Narragansett Language Manuscript. International Journal of American Linguistics 65(2):228-232 (1999).

External links
 Narragansett Language information
 Narrangansett Dictionary
 
   (abstract)

 
 	OLAC resources in and about the Narragansett language
Dr. Frank Waabu O'Brien, Aquidneck Indian Council. New England Algonquian Language Revival. Retrieved 2017-01-24

Narragansett tribe
Eastern Algonquian languages
Indigenous languages of Massachusetts
Extinct languages of North America
Indigenous languages of the North American eastern woodlands
Languages extinct in the 17th century